Neohesperidose is the disaccharide which is present in some flavonoids. It can be found in species of Typha.  Neohesperidosides 

 Cyanidin-3-neohesperidoside
 Delphinidin-3-neohesperidoside
 Rhoifolin or apigenin 7-O-neohesperidoside
 Myricetin-3-O-neohesperidoside found in Physalis angulata Neohesperidin (hesperetin 7-O-neohesperidoside)
 Neoeriocitrin (eriodictyol 7-O''-neohesperidoside)

References 
 Synthesis of neohesperidose, B. H. Koeppen, 1968

External links 
 Neohesperidose on rdchemicals.com

Disaccharides
Deoxy sugars